Liandro Rudwendry Filipe Martis (born 13 November 1995) is a Curaçaoan professional footballer who plays as a winger for Bulgarian First League club Spartak Varna.

Career
Following trials with Buxton, Tranmere Rovers and Oldham Athletic, Martis went on trial with Manchester United at the end of July 2016.

In August 2016, Martis signed a contract with Leicester City. In January 2019 he signed for Macclesfield Town on a short-term deal, but was released at the end of the season. In June 2022, he joined Spartak Varna on a two-year contract.

International career
Martis made his international debut for Curaçao as a 16 year old against Aruba in a 3-2 friendly defeat on 14 July 2012.

International

References

External links 
 

1995 births
Living people
Association football forwards
Curaçao footballers
Curaçao international footballers
Curaçao expatriate footballers
Curaçao expatriate sportspeople in Cyprus
Feyenoord players
Willem II (football club) players
Leicester City F.C. players
Macclesfield Town F.C. players
PFC Spartak Varna players
Onisilos Sotira players
Cypriot Second Division players
Expatriate footballers in Cyprus
RKSV Scherpenheuvel players